Sherburne is a ghost town located in Pointe Coupee Parish, Louisiana, United States in the Atchafalaya National Wildlife Refuge.

Overview 
Sherburne was founded as a logging camp and sawmill town in the 1880s on the Atchafalaya River in the Atchafalaya Basin using the abundant trees in the region. It is unknown how many residents there were and the town was abandoned in the early 1900s. By the 1930s the town was permanently abandoned.

References 

Ghost towns in Louisiana
Geography of Pointe Coupee Parish, Louisiana